Taw, tav, or taf is the twenty-second and last letter of the Semitic abjads, including Phoenician Tāw  , Hebrew Tav , Aramaic Taw , Syriac Taw ܬ, and Arabic ت Tāʼ  (22nd in abjadi order, 3rd in modern order). In Arabic, it also gives rise to the derived letter  Ṯāʼ.

The Phoenician letter gave rise to the Greek tau (Τ), Latin T, and Cyrillic Т.

Origins of taw
Taw is believed to be derived from the Egyptian hieroglyph representing a tally mark (viz. a decussate cross) Z9

Arabic tāʼ

The letter is named . It is written in several ways depending on its position in the word:

Final  (fatha, then  with a sukun on it, pronounced , though diacritics are normally omitted) is used to mark feminine gender for third-person perfective/past tense verbs, while final  is used to mark past-tense second-person singular masculine verbs, final  to mark past-tense second-person singular feminine verbs, and final  to mark past-tense first-person singular verbs.

Recently, the isolated  has been used online as an emoticon, because it resembles a smiling face.

Tāʼ marbūṭa
An alternative form called  (ـَة, ة), "bound ") is used at the end of words to mark feminine gender for nouns and adjectives.

Historically,  was pronounced as the  sound in all positions, but now the  sound is dropped in coda positions.

When the possessive suffix  ('my') is added, it becomes  ('my letter') .

When words containing the symbol are borrowed into other languages written in the Arabic alphabet (such as Persian),  usually becomes either a regular  or a regular .

Hebrew Tav

Hebrew spelling:

Hebrew pronunciation
The letter tav in Modern Hebrew usually represents a voiceless alveolar plosive: .

Variations on written form and pronunciation 
The letter tav is one of the six letters that can receive a dagesh kal diacritic; the others are bet, gimel, dalet, kaph and pe. Bet, kaph and pe have their sound values changed in modern Hebrew from the fricative to the plosive, by adding a dagesh. In modern Hebrew, the other three do not change their pronunciation with or without a dagesh, but they have had alternate pronunciations at other times and places.

In traditional Ashkenazi pronunciation, tav represents an  without the dagesh and has the plosive form when it has the dagesh. Among Yemen and some Sephardi areas, tav without a dagesh represented a voiceless dental fricative —a pronunciation hailed by the Sfath Emeth work as wholly authentic, while the tav with the dagesh is the plosive . In traditional Italian pronunciation, tav without a dagesh is sometimes .

Tav with a geresh is sometimes used in order to represent the TH digraph in loanwords.

Significance of tav

In representing names from foreign languages, a geresh or chupchik can also be placed after the tav, making it represent . (See also: Hebraization of English)

In Judaism
Tav is the last letter of the Hebrew word emet, which means 'truth'. The midrash explains that emet is made up of the first, middle, and last letters of the Hebrew alphabet (aleph, mem,). Sheqer (שקר, falsehood), on the other hand, is made up of the 19th, 20th, and 21st (and penultimate) letters.

Thus, truth is all-encompassing, while falsehood is narrow and deceiving. In Jewish mythology it was the word emet that was carved into the head of the golem which ultimately gave it life.  But when the letter aleph was erased from the golem's forehead, what was left was "met"—dead.  And so the golem died.

Ezekiel 9:4 depicts a vision in which the tav plays a Passover role similar to the blood on the lintel and doorposts of a Hebrew home in Egypt. In Ezekiel's vision, the Lord has his angels separate the demographic wheat from the chaff by going through Jerusalem, the capital city of ancient Israel, and inscribing a mark, a tav, "upon the foreheads of the men that sigh and that cry for all the abominations that be done in the midst thereof."

In Ezekiel's vision, then, the Lord is counting tav-marked Israelites as worthwhile to spare, but counts the people worthy of annihilation who lack the tav and the critical attitude it signifies. In other words, looking askance at a culture marked by dire moral decline is a kind of shibboleth for loyalty and zeal for God.

Sayings with taf
"From aleph to taf" describes something from beginning to end, the Hebrew equivalent of the English "From A to Z."

Syriac taw
In the Syriac alphabet, as in the Hebrew and Phoenician alphabets, taw or tăw ( or ) is the final letter in the alphabet, most commonly representing the voiceless dental stop  and fricative  consonant pair, differentiated phonemically by hard and soft markings. When left as unmarked    or marked with a qūššāyā dot above the letter    indicating 'hard' pronunciation, it is realized as a plosive . When the phoneme is marked with a rūkkāḵā dot below the letter    indicating 'soft' pronunciation, the phone is spirantized to a fricative .

Character encodings

See also
Tav (number)

Footnotes

External links

Phoenician alphabet
Arabic letters
Hebrew letters
Cross symbols